The 2017–18 NWHL season was the third season of the National Women's Hockey League. All four teams from the previous two seasons returned for this season: the Boston Pride, Buffalo Beauts, Connecticut Whale, and the Metropolitan Riveters.

League news and notes
In October 2017, the Russian women's national team participated in exhibition series, called the 2017 Summit Series, going 5–0 against the Pride, Riveters, and Whale. The Beauts played one game against the Chinese national team, which the Beauts won 4–2.
A Battle of the Sexes match was scheduled between the Buffalo Beauts and Buffalo Jr. Sabres 15U youth team for October 16 with the Jr. Sabres 15U winning 9–4.
On October 5, the New York Riveters partnered with the New Jersey Devils of the National Hockey League. The Riveters, having played in Newark, New Jersey, the previous season, rebranded as the Metropolitan Riveters. As part of the partnership, the Riveters had their opening home game at the Prudential Center.
On December 14, the NWHL announced that they are playing USA Hockey Women's National Team in Tampa Bay for two exhibition matches for January playing at the U.S. Women’s National Team’s training complex at Florida Hospital Center Ice.
On December 21, the Buffalo Beauts were acquired by their landlord, Pegula Sports and Entertainment; Pegula owns several sports teams in the Buffalo area, including the NHL's Buffalo Sabres.

Head coaching and front office personnel changes

Head coaches

Regular season

News and notes

Brittany Ott of the Boston Pride and Amanda Leveille of the Buffalo Beauts served as team captains for the 3rd NWHL All-Star Game.

Standings
Final standings.

Playoffs

Awards and honors
 Alexa Gruschow, Metropolitan Riveters, 2018 NWHL Most Valuable Player
 Alexa Gruschow, Metropolitan Riveters, 2018 NWHL Scoring Champion
 Jillian Dempsey, Boston Pride, 2018 NWHL Denna Laing Perseverance Award
 Courtney Burke, Metropolitan Riveters, 2018 NWHL Defensive Player of the Year Award
 Amanda Leveille, Buffalo Beauts, 2018 NWHL Goaltender of the Year
 Hayley Scamurra, Buffalo Beauts, 2018 NWHL Rookie of the Year

Player of the Week

Draft
The 2017 NWHL draft was the third in the history of the National Women's Hockey League and took place on August 17, 2017, in Brooklyn. Goaltender Katie Burt of Boston College was selected first overall by the Boston Pride. It marked the first time that the Boston Pride held the first pick overall in the draft, which the franchise obtained from the Connecticut Whale in the trade that sent Zoe Hickel to the Whale on February 7, 2017.

References

External links

 

 
NWHL
Premier Hockey Federation seasons